The Sacrifice of Isaac is a 1635 autograph oil on canvas work by Rembrandt, now in the Hermitage Museum. A studio copy of it dating to 1636 is now in the Alte Pinakothek in Munich.

References

Paintings by Rembrandt
1636 paintings
Paintings in the collection of the Hermitage Museum
Rembrandt